KWIP (880 AM) is a radio station broadcasting a Regional Mexican format. Licensed to Dallas, Oregon, United States, it serves the Salem, Oregon, area.  The station is currently owned by Jupiter Communications Corporation.  .

880 AM is a United States clear-channel frequency; WCBS in New York, New York is the Class A station on the frequency.

History
KWIP once had the call letters KROW. KWIP was the call sign held by a Merced, California, station operating on 1580 kHz (1950s and 1960s)

In the early 1980s, KWIP was owned by radio and TV announcer Roger Carroll.

Translator
KWIP is also broadcast on the following translator:

References

External links

WIP
WIP
Regional Mexican radio stations in the United States
Dallas, Oregon
Radio stations established in 1955
1955 establishments in Oregon